Events in the year 1958 in the Republic of India.

Incumbents
 President of India – Rajendra Prasad
 Prime Minister of India – Jawaharlal Nehru
 Vice President of India – Sarvepalli Radhakrishnan
 Chief Justice of India – Sudhi Ranjan Das

Governors
 Andhra Pradesh – Bhim Sen Sachar 
 Assam – Saiyid Fazal Ali 
 Bihar – Zakir Hussain 
 Karnataka – Jayachamarajendra Wadiyar 
 Kerala – Burgula Ramakrishna Rao 
 Madhya Pradesh – Hari Vinayak Pataskar
 Maharashtra – Sri Prakasa
 Odisha – Bhim Sen Sachar 
 Punjab – Chandeshwar Prasad Narayan Singh (until 15 September), Narahar Vishnu Gadgil (starting 15 September)
 Rajasthan – Gurumukh Nihal Singh 
 Uttar Pradesh – Kanhaiyalal Maneklal Munshi 
 West Bengal – Padmaja Naidu

Events
 National income - 152,835 million
 1 january - DRDO was established
 18 February – Finance minister of India T. T. Krishnamachari resigns following M. C. Chagla Commission report on Haridas Mundhra LIC scandal.
 28 February – Jawaharlal Nehru presents Union budget of India as Finance Minister. 
 26 March - Mother India becomes the first ever Cinema of India to get nominated in the Academy Awards. 
 18 to 20 May – The 16th Session of Indian Labour Congress was held at New Delhi.
 Vimochana Samaram against First Namboodiripad ministry in Kerala
 Unknown date – Reliance Industries was founded by Dhirubhai Ambani in Bombay (present day in Mumbai), as predecessor name was Reliance Commercial Corporation.

Law
 22 May – Armed Forces (Assam and Manipur) Special Powers Ordinance came into force
 11 September – The Armed Forces (Special Powers) Act, 1958 is passed by the Parliament.
 1 October – The Standards of Weights and Measures Act took effect.

Sport
Kunwar Digvijay Singh Babu (field hockey player) is awarded the Padma Shri.
Milkha Singh (field athletics player) had won the gold medal

Births
5 March – Nassar, actor, producer, writer, director, lyricist and singer.
29 April – Saumen Guha, political activist, human rights campaigner and author.
30 May  K. S. Ravikumar, film director and actor.
16 August – R. R. Patil, politician (died 2015)
19 September – Lucky Ali, singer, composer and actor
23 September – G. Srinivasan, film producer (died 2007).
14 October  R. Parthiban, actor and director.
17 December  Jayasudha, actress.

See also 
 List of Bollywood films of 1958

References

 
India
Years of the 20th century in India